Pirjo Peltola (born July 26, 1961, in Karstula) is a Finnish sport shooter. She competed in rifle shooting events at the Summer Olympics in 1988 and 1992.

Olympic results

References

1961 births
Living people
ISSF rifle shooters
Finnish female sport shooters
Shooters at the 1988 Summer Olympics
Shooters at the 1992 Summer Olympics
Olympic shooters of Finland
People from Karstula
Sportspeople from Central Finland